St. Mary (Blackfeet: , "Holy Woman") is an unincorporated community on the western border of the Blackfeet Indian Reservation adjacent to Glacier National Park in Glacier County, Montana, United States.

About 54 people reside in the village year-round; however, the population increases tenfold on a busy summer evening. Several lodges, restaurants and cafés, a small grocery store, two gas stations and campgrounds are located in the village. A large housing area for National Park Service personnel is located adjacent to the village, but within the park.

U.S. Route 89 passes through the village, which lies between Saint Mary Lake in Glacier National Park and Lower St. Mary Lake on the Blackfeet Indian Reservation.

Demographics

Climate
This climatic region is typified by large seasonal temperature differences, with warm to hot (and often humid) summers and cold (sometimes severely cold) winters. According to the Köppen Climate Classification system, St. Mary has a humid continental climate, abbreviated "Dfb" on climate maps.

See also
 Saint Mary Visitor Center, Entrance Station and Checking Stations

Images

References

External links

 

Glacier National Park (U.S.)
Unincorporated communities in Glacier County, Montana
Unincorporated communities in Montana